Hostal de Pinós is one of the oldest hostals in Spain. It was founded in 1524 and is located in Pinós, Lleida, Spain.

The inn has never closed its doors from the start and offers three dining rooms: a central with capacity for 60 people and two small with a capacity 23 people.

See also 
List of oldest companies

References

External links 
Homepage

Hotels in Spain
Restaurants in Spain
Companies established in the 16th century
16th-century establishments in Spain